Karakese is a town in Hatay Province, Turkey.

Geography

Karakese is a town in Dörtyol district which is a part of Hatay Province. The population of Karakese was 6,211 as of 2011.

History

The area around Karakese had always been inhabited all through the history. But the settlement was founded about 500 years ago by Turkmen people who were subjects of Akkoyunlu sultanate, but escaped to south after the Battle of Otlukbeli in 1473. The settlement is known as one of the first places where Turkish resistance to French occupation began after the First World War. (One quarter of Karakese is named İlkkurşun  meaning  "First bullet" referring to the first resistance on 11 December 1918.) 1992 the settlement was declared a seat of township.

Economy
Main economic activity of the town is citrus and fresh vegetable farming. People working in services and industry around Dörtyol also contribute to Town economy.

References

Populated places in Hatay Province
Towns in Turkey
Dörtyol District